Manco Kapac is a province in the Bolivian department of La Paz. Its capital is Copacabana.

Subdivision 
Manco Kapac Province is divided into three municipalities which are partly further subdivided into cantons.

Places of interest 
 Chinkana
 Iñaq Uyu
 Pachat'aqa
 Pillkukayna
 Yampupata Peninsula

References 
 www.ine.gov.bo / census 2001

External links 
 Map of Manco Kapac Province

Provinces of La Paz Department (Bolivia)